Coleman Creek may refer to:

Coleman Creek (San Diego County), a stream in California
Coleman Creek (Bear Creek tributary), a stream in Oregon
Coleman Creek (Hyco River tributary), a stream in Halifax County, Virginia